Şahbəyli (also, Şahbeyli and Shakhbeyli) is a village and municipality in the Kurdamir Rayon of Azerbaijan.

References 

Populated places in Kurdamir District